Jacobs Corner is an unincorporated community in Yolo County, California. The first post office was established in 1909 and discontinued in 1910. The community was named after Mattie Cole Jacobs, the first postmaster.

A post office operated at Jacobs Corner from 1909 to 1910.

References

External links

Unincorporated communities in California
Unincorporated communities in Yolo County, California